Under the Whyte notation for the classification of steam locomotives,  represents the wheel arrangement of two leading wheels, ten powered and coupled driving wheels, and two trailing wheels.

Overview
The  wheel arrangement evolved in the United States from the 2-10-0 Decapod of the Atchison, Topeka and Santa Fe Railway (ATSF). Their existing 2-10-0 tandem compound locomotives, used as pushers up Raton Pass, encountered problems reversing back down the grade for their next assignments since they were unable to track around curves at speed in reverse and had to run very slowly to avoid derailing. Consequently, the ATSF added a trailing truck to the locomotives which allowed them to operate successfully in both directions. These first  locomotives became the forerunners to the entire  family.

Like all ten-coupled designs, the long rigid wheelbase of the coupled wheels presented a problem on curves, requiring flangeless drivers, lateral motion devices and much sideplay on the outer axles.

Further, the  had other inherent restrictions. The massive cylinders that were required on locomotives in the United States for high tractive effort had the result that no reasonably sized valves could admit and exhaust steam at a sufficient rate to permit fast running. The peak of the  design limitations was reached in the United States in 1926 and was overcome with the advent of the superior 2-10-4 design.

Usage
Locomotives with a  wheel arrangement were used in a number of countries around the world, including those in North America, Western Europe, China, the Soviet Union and Africa. A large number of European  were tank locomotives, taking advantage of the symmetrical nature of the wheel arrangement.

Argentina
The metre gauge General Manuel Belgrano Railway in Argentina operated the E2 series of 2-10-2 locomotives. In 1956, Mitsubishi Heavy Industries of Japan constructed a batch of ten 2-10-2s based on this design for the isolated Ramal Ferro Industrial Río Turbio (RFIRP) 750 mm gauge railway in the southern Patagonian Desert, to haul coal from Río Turbio for shipping from Río Gallegos, Santa Cruz. These required modification by Livio Dante Porta to achieve their full potential. Ten more powerful examples were introduced into service in 1964.

Belgian Congo
Two classes of  locomotives were used in the Belgian Congo.
 Two locomotives were built by Forges, Usines et Fonderies de Haine-Saint-Pierre for the CF du Congo Superieur aux Grands Lacs Africains in 1937, numbered 60 and 61.
 One locomotive was built for the CF du Bas-Congo au Katanga by Société Anonyme John Cockerill in 1947, numbered 901 and later renumbered 802.

Canada
In 1916, Canadian National Railways (CNR) took delivery of ten Class T-1-a 2-10-2s from an order made by the short-lived Canadian Government Railways and built by ALCO. Ten more were delivered from the Montreal Locomotive Works in 1918, and another 25 slightly modified T-1-cs in 1920 that were 1,100 pounds lighter. Canadian Locomotive Company produced five T-2-as in 1924. Ten ALCO's named "T-3-a" were acquired from the Boston and Albany Railroad in 1928. Canadian Locomotive Company produced the last series of 2-10-2s for CNR, a batch of 15 T-4-as in 1929, and 18 T-4-bs in 1930.

The 2-10-2s began to be scrapped in the mid-1950s, with the last models being used until 1961. There are two surviving CNR 2-10-2 locomotives. One is No. 4008, on display at the CNR Station in Rainy River, Ontario, and the other is No. 4100, on display at the Canadian Railway Museum in Delson, QC.

China

The mainstay of Chinese steam was their  locomotives. This was the wheel arrangement of the Chinese QJ class locomotives that were based on the Soviet locomotive class LV and built by Datong Locomotive Works from 1959. They were produced until 1988 and were still in widespread service until the final steam runs in 2005.

After retirement, some of these QJ class locomotives found their way to the United States, where they are used in revenue freight and excursion service. In Train Festival 2011, Multipower International restored two Chinese locomotives to Federal Railroad Administration (FRA) Part 230 specifications and delivered them to the Railroad Development Corporation.

Germany

Examples on the German railway systems included classes BR84 and BR85, both standard tank locomotive designs built in 1935 and 1937 respectively, and class BR95, a tank locomotive built in 1922 by the Prussian State Railways as the Prussian T 20.

From 1936, the German railways built 28 three-cylinder  tender freight locomotives of class BR45, which were the most powerful steam locomotives on the system.

Further examples, still in regular service, are the metre-gauge DR Class 99.23-24 on the Harz Narrow Gauge Railways and the 750 mm-gauge DR Class 99.77-79 on the Rügen narrow-gauge railway.

Mozambique

While the  wheel arrangement was not very common in Africa, the Lourenco Marques system in Mozambique (Caminhos de Ferro de Moçambique or CFM) had altogether 37 locomotives of this type, in three classes.
 Nine locomotives of the Series 200, numbered 201 to 209, were built by Baldwin Locomotive Works between 1915 and 1919.
 Six more Santa Fe type locomotives of the Series 214, numbered 214 to 219, were built by Henschel and Son in 1951.
 Twenty-two locomotives of the Series 250, numbered 251 to 272, were built by Henschel in 1955.

Philippines

The Manila Railroad Company (now the Philippine National Railways) acquired ten 200-class locomotives in 1922 from the American Locomotive Company (Alco) and was purchased alongside the 4-8-2 170-class. Based on Henry Kirke Porter's acclaimed design of the 45 class, these were intended to replace the original Scottish-built tank locomotives as well as a small group of 4-4-2 tender locomotives that were acquired from the company's predecessors.

This class also had one of the largest cylinders of any unarticulated Cape-gauge locomotive according to Alco, but it comparatively had small boilers and grills. Their arrival also called for larger  turntables in both ends of the line, making them some of the largest and most powerful locomotives that entered Philippine service.

Out of ten locomotives, four managed to survive World War II, all of which were still in active service in 1952. However, these locomotives were retired after the MRR turned to upgrading its fleet to diesel locomotives in 1956. Not a single unit was preserved.

Poland
Twenty-five OKz32 2-10-2 tank locomotives were built by H. Cegielski – Poznań and delivered to PKP between 1934 and 1936. They were used mainly to work passenger trains between Kraków and Zakopane, a difficult railway line, steep in places, with many sharp curves, and requiring three direction changes. One has been preserved in working condition.

Romania

Romania designed its 151.000 Class as freight locomotives to serve on the Căile Ferate Române (CFR).

Two of these locomotives were built by the Malaxa Works in 1939 and 1941, numbered 151.001 and 151.002. Number 151.002 was preserved.

South Africa

On , this wheel arrangement was first used by the South African Railways (SAR) in 1927. Two Class 18 steam locomotives, the most powerful non-articulated locomotives to see service on the SAR, were introduced on the line between Witbank and Germiston in an attempt to ease problems that were being experienced with increasingly heavy coal trains. It was designed by Colonel F.R. Collins DSO, Chief Mechanical Engineer of the SAR from 1922 to 1929, and built by Henschel and Son in Germany. They were three-cylinder locomotives, with the two outer cylinders using Walschaerts valve gear and the inner cylinder using Gresley conjugated valve gear, actuated by the motions of the outer cylinders.

One more  locomotive, the Class 20, was designed for branch line work on light rail by A.G. Watson, Chief Mechanical Engineer from 1929 to 1936. Only one locomotive was built by the SAR at its Pretoria Mechanical Shops at Salvokop in 1935.

In 1950, this sole Class 20 locomotive was modified to an experimental condensing locomotive, equipped with a condensing tender that was ordered from Henschel in Germany in 1948. Beginning in 1951, tests with the condensing Class 20 were conducted in the Eastern Transvaal and the Karoo. The positive results of the condensing trials proved the viability of condensing locomotives in South Africa and led to the introduction of the Class 25  condensing locomotive fleet in 1953.

Soviet Union
In the Soviet Union,  locomotives were used to haul heavy freight trains. Two series were relatively common, the FD (for Felix Dzerzhinsky) with more than three thousand built through the 1930s, and the LV (Lebedyanskii, modified by the Voroshilovgrad factory).

The FD class was developed from ALCO and Baldwin heavy freight locomotives that were imported to Soviet Russia, where they were designated as the Ta and Tb classes respectively. The first FD class locomotive was built at the Lugansk Locomotive Factory in 1931.

In 1932, the Voroshilovgradskom plant began with the mass production of ФД20 locomotives. In the process of production, their construction was improved constantly. Production was interrupted at the outbreak of the Great Patriotic war in 1941 and was only resumed in 1942, when four locomotives were built in Ulan Ude. The total production was 2,927 locomotives of ФД20, and 286 locomotives of ФД21. The two subclasses only differed in respect of their types of superheater.

In 1958, 1,054 FD class locomotives were sold to China, where they worked until the 1980s. A much lesser number were sold to North Korea at around the same time.

The Russian locomotive class LV was developed from the previous L class 2-10-0 locomotive by the Voroshilovgrad factory. It used a feedwater heater to increase thermal efficiency and was the most efficient freight steam locomotive in the Soviet Union, with thermal efficiency of 9.3%. The first prototype was named OR18-01 (October Revolution factory, 18 tonne axle load). A total of 522 LV class locomotives were built. Several were preserved, including the first, OR18-01, and the last, LV-0522.

Spain
In Spain, the  wheel arrangement was represented by one series of 22 locomotives. They were initially ordered for the Compañía del Norte, but RENFE kept the entire series in reserve. Built between 1941 and 1944 in the La Maquinista Terrestre y Maritima SA factory in Barcelona for hauling heavy coal trains, they were amongst the most powerful steam locomotives in Europe. They had three cylinders, but used simple expansion and were known as Santa Fe locomotives.

Greece

SEK (Sidirodromoi Ellinikou Kratous, Hellenic State Railways) class Μα (or class Ma; Mu-alpha) was a class of 2-10-2 steam locomotives built by Ansaldo and Breda in 1953. They were numbered Μα 1001-1020.

The Μα locomotives were the last steam locomotives acquired by SEK before conversion to diesel traction. They were designed and built in Italy by Breda (10 units) and Ansaldo (10 units) in 1953–1954, while some parts (including whole tender underframes) were made by Nuove Reggiane. The length of the locomotive with the tender was 24.93 m, the maximum height 4.51 m and service weight 136 tn. The boiler operated at 18 bar and their rated power was 2950 hp. Maximum speed was 90 km/h.

Due to various technical problems, only two years after introduction they were modified by Henschel (1957–1958). The boilers were converted to burn heavy fuel oil.

These locomotives were based at Aghios Ioannis Rentis and Thessaloniki depots and were used mainly for freight trains and for some express passenger trains on Piraeus–Thessaloniki and Thessaloniki–Idomeni mainlines until the early 1970s, when they were withdrawn by the Hellenic Railways Organisation (successor of SEK) due to complete conversion to diesel traction.

Only two examples survived the 1984-1985 steam locomotives scrappings. One of them, 1002 was set on display as part of the theatre "Το Τρένο στο Ρουφ" (="The Train at Rouf"), at Rouf station in Athens. The other one is located at Thessaloniki old railway station, not preserved.

United States

In the United States, the  type was produced between 1903 and 1930. The first were the Atchison, Topeka and Santa Fe Railway (AT&SF) engines of the 900 and 1600 series, which were an early type with few advantages over the 2-10-0 Decapod, save their ability to operate in reverse without derailing. By 1919, the AT&SF was building the definitive type, with the trailing truck supporting a large firebox. These were of the AT&SF 3800 class. One of them, AT&SF engine no. 3829, was equipped with an experimental two-axle trailing truck to become the first 2-10-4 Texas type.

About 2,200 Santa Fe types were built, including about 500 of the two United States Railroad Administration (USRA) First World War standard designs. The Santa Fe had the most with 352 engines.

Of the 2-10-2’s built for the Santa Fe, only one has been preserved.  AT&SF No. 940 is on static display outside the Santa Fe depot, now a Visitor Center, in Bartlesville, Oklahoma.

The heaviest s were ten locomotives built by Baldwin Locomotive Works for the Reading Railway c. 1931, weighing , engine only.

At , the Illinois Central Railroad's 2800 class rebuilds probably had the highest calculated tractive effort of any two-cylinder steam locomotive, although the adhesive weight was only .

The Baltimore and Ohio Railroad ordered its first  from Baldwin in 1914. From 1914 to 1956, their  bore numbers commencing with 6, hence the nickname "Big Sixes". Designated the S class, there were several sub-classes. The first of the Big Sixes was retired in 1951 and were all scrapped by 1960.

The Southern Railway (SOU) ordered its first batches of fifty-five 2-10-2 Ss class steam locomotives (Nos. 5000-5054) from Baldwin in 1917. The second batches of twenty-five 2-10-2s (Nos. 6350-6374) were built by the American Locomotive Company's (ALCO) Richmond Works in 1918 originally for SOU's Cincinnati, New Orleans and Texas Pacific (CNO&TP) division. The latter batches were later moved to the SOU's main division and renumbered to 5055-5079 when they were proved to be too bulky for the CNO&TP tunnels' tight clearances. After receiving the last batches of Ss types, the SOU received fifty more 2-10-2s (Nos. 5200-5249) from ALCO's Brook Works in a USRA Light Santa Fe design which were classified as Ss-1. Both classes were assigned to SOU's Asheville division, banking and hauling heavy freight trains up the steep Saluda Grade and Old Fort Loops in the Blue Ridge Mountains. Between the late 1930s and the early 1950s, all of the Ss and Ss-1 steam locomotives were retired and scrapped with none surviving into preservation.

The Union Pacific Railroad rostered 144 2-10-2 locomotives, under the designation of TTT (Two-Ten-Two). They were divided into classes TTT-1 through TTT-7, but all had the same cylinder dimensions, driving wheel diameter and boiler pressure. Of these, only one locomotive survives; Union Pacific 5511 was donated to the Railroading Heritage of Midwest America, who plans to restore the locomotive to operating condition.

References

10,2-10-2